Steven Charles Kanumba (8 January 1984 – 7 April 2012) was a Tanzanian actor and director of Sukuma heritage, born in Shinyanga Region. Kanumba died in 2012 at the age of 28, for which actress Elizabeth Michael was convicted of involuntary manslaughter and sentenced two years in prison in November 2017. Over 30,000 people were estimated to have attended his funeral. He was described as "Tanzania's most popular film star", and appeared in Nollywood films.

Early life
Kanumba was born into a Sukuma family in the Shinyanga Region in Northern Tanzania. His father was Charles Kanumba and his mother was Flora Mutegoa. Kanumba had three older sisters. He began his studies at Bugoyi Primary School and continued with his secondary studies at Mwadui Secondary School, later transferring to Vosa Mission Secondary School. He joined Jitegemee High School for his high level education. He spoke three languages fluently: Swahili, Sukuma and English.

Career
Kanumba began acting in the 1990s in church productions. In 2002, he joined the theater group Kaole Arts Group. He appeared in the television soap operas Jahazi and Dira and made his film debut in Haviliki. In 2006 he met Nazz who gave him advice and further connections for his career. He appeared in Dar 2 Lagos (Part 1) (Part 2), a film by Mtitu Game that used both Tanzanian and Nigerian actors and crew. He also appeared in the films She is My Sister, This Is It, and Love Gamble. In 2009, he was a special celebrity guest on Big Brother Africa 4.

In 2011, Kanumba was named an Oxfam GROW Ambassador. Shortly before his death he had been preparing for his first Hollywood film role, although he was already "Tanzania's most popular film star" and appeared in Nollywood films.

Death
Kanumba died after he fell in his bedroom on 7 April 2012, apparently from a head injury after falling and hitting his head on the wall. Elizabeth "Lulu" Michael, 17-year-old girlfriend at that time, was charged with manslaughter in connection with the death. Kanumba was taken unconscious to Muhimbili National Referral Hospital where he was declared dead. Michael was arrested and stayed in remand for almost a year for investigation. Later, the charges were amended to involuntary manslaughter.

In January 2013 Michael was granted bail. In October 2017 She testified to the High Court of Tanzania that after Kanumba confronted her, he took her to his room by force and starting beating her with a sword while he was intoxicated, she claimed that Kanumba fell down and hit his head while beating her with the sword. In 2017, Lulu was convicted of involuntary manslaughter for his death and sentenced to two years in prison. Her sentence was then changed from two years imprisonment to community services and she was released from jail on 12 May 2018, after serving at least a year in jail.

His funeral was attended by around 30,000 people including the first lady of Tanzania, Salma Kikwete, Vice President Dr. Mohamed Gharib Bilal, and the minister for culture and sport, Emmanuel Nchimbi. Kanumba was buried in Kinondoni Cemetery.

Filmography

Television
Jahazi
Dira
Zizimo
Tufani
Sayari
Taswira
Gharika
Baragumu

Film

Awards and nominations

References

External links
Steven Kanumba's song "Nitayainua Macho Yangu"

Tanzanian male film actors
1984 births
2012 deaths
Deaths from falls
Tanzanian film directors
Tanzanian screenwriters
Manslaughter victims
Sukuma
Male screenwriters
21st-century Tanzanian actors